Gun-britt Birgitta Sewik (born 13 January 1949) is a Swedish female curler.

She competed at the 1988 Winter Olympics when curling was a demonstration sport.

In 1982 she was inducted into the Swedish Curling Hall of Fame.

Teams

Women's

Mixed

References

External links
 

Living people
1949 births
Swedish female curlers
World curling champions
European curling champions
Swedish curling champions
Curlers at the 1988 Winter Olympics
Olympic curlers of Sweden